Diadegma areolator is a wasp first described by Aubert in 1974.  No subspecies are listed.

References

areolator
Insects described in 1974